was a district located in Hiroshima Prefecture, Japan.

Towns
 Kōda
 Midori
 Mukaihara
 Takamiya
 Yachiyo
 Yoshida

Merger
 On March 1, 2004 - the towns of Kōta, Midori, Mukaihara, Takamiya, Yachiyo and Yoshida were merged to create the city of Akitakata. Therefore, Takata District was dissolved as a result of this merger.

Former districts of Hiroshima Prefecture